WSFG-LD 51 is a low-power television station in Fayette County, Alabama which receives religious programming via satellite for terrestrial rebroadcast.

WSSF-LP 48 was a station commonly owned with WSFG-LD.

In 2008 both stations, despite their LPTV status, successfully forced their programming onto West Alabama TV Cable, a local cable television provider in Hamilton-Winfield-Fayette, Alabama, by using the terrestrial loophole in federal must-carry regulations which allow "qualified LPTV stations" to obtain mandatory cable carriage normally reserved for full-power stations. The use of this provision is based on a claim that no full-power station serves Fayette County, that the community is not part of any of the 160 largest metropolitan statistical areas and that the stations meet specific technical criteria (such as signal coverage and number of hours of programming) which apply to full-service stations seeking carriage.

WSSF-LP's license was cancelled by the Federal Communications Commission on September 9, 2013, due to the station failing to file an application for license renewal.

Digital television

Digital channels
The station's digital signal is multiplexed:

References

External links

Low-power television stations in the United States